Cecily Hill may refer to:

Cecily Hill, representative in the Georgia General Assembly, 2002
 Lydia Cecilia Hill (1913–1940), British dancer, used stage name Cecily Hill